Once Again is a collaboration between guitarists Peter Tork and James Lee Stanley released in 2001 by Beachwood Recordings. It was Tork's third studio album without The Monkees and the second of three collaborations with Stanley.

Reception

Aaron Badgley of AllMusic wrote that Once Again is an "excellent follow-up," calling the song arrangements "simple yet beautiful".

Track listing

Personnel 
Peter Tork – vocals, acoustic guitar, electric guitar, banjo, producer
James Lee Stanley – vocals, acoustic guitar,  electric guitar, producer

References

2001 albums
Collaborative albums
Peter Tork albums